Lív Finnbogadóttir Arge Poulsen (née Finnbogadóttir Arge; born 20 March 1997) is a Faroese football midfielder who currently plays for Havnar Bóltfelag.

Honours 
Havnar Bóltfelag
Runners-up
 Faroese Women's Cup: 2014

International goals
Scores and results list Faroe Islands' goal tally first.

References

External links 
 

1997 births
Living people
Women's association football midfielders
Faroese women's footballers
People from Tórshavn
Faroe Islands women's youth international footballers
Faroe Islands women's international footballers
Havnar Bóltfelag players